The 2004–05 OB I bajnokság season was the 68th season of the OB I bajnokság, the top level of ice hockey in Hungary. Six teams participated in the league, and Alba Volan Szekesfehervar won the championship.

First round

Second round

Final round

Playoffs

5th place 
 Miskolci Jegesmedvék JSE - Gyori HC 3:0/3:5

3rd place
 Újpesti TE - Ferencvárosi TC 3:2 (4:2, 3:4 n.P., 4:0, 1:5, 4:2)

Final 
 Alba Volán Székesfehérvár - Dunaújvárosi AC 4:3 (3:4, 0:6, 3:1, 0:3, 3:2 SO, 5:1, 1:0)

External links
 Season on hockeyarchives.info

OB I bajnoksag seasons
Hun
OB